Classis may refer to:

Classis (ecclesiastical), governing body of pastors and elders in certain churches
Classis (biology), or class, a taxonomic rank or unit in biology
Classis (port), or Classe, ancient port of Ravenna, Italy
Roman classis, fleet of Roman navy